13 is the first full-length album released by New Zealand band, HLAH. The album peaked at #17 on the New Zealand albums chart.

Track listing
 "Hole"
 "Life's A Joke"
 "Never Mind Today"
 "Afro Surprise"
 "Wrapped To Death"
 "Fish Across Face"
 "Fat Little Man"
 "Penut"
 "Big Mouth"
 "Narcotics, Noise & Nakedness"
 "Ritual Groovemeister"
 "12"

References

1993 debut albums
HLAH albums
Wildside Records albums